Mosby is a city in Clay County, Missouri, United States, along the Fishing River. The population was 101 at the 2020 census. It is part of the Kansas City metropolitan area.

History
A post office called Mosby was established in 1887, and remained in operation until 1999. The city was named after A. G. Mosby, the original owner of the site.

Geography
Mosby is located at  (39.314190, -94.303369).

Demographics

2010 census
At the 2010 census there were 190 people, 72 households, and 47 families living in the city. The racial makup of the city was 97.4% White, 1.1% African American, 0.5% Asian, 0.5% from other races, and 0.5% from two or more races. Hispanic or Latino of any race were 1.6%.

Of the 72 households, 29.2% had children under the age of 18 living with them, 47.2% were married couples living together, 9.7% had a female householder with no husband present, 8.3% had a male householder with no wife present, and 34.7% were non-families. 26.4% of households were one person, and 7% were one person aged 65 or older. The average household size was 2.64 and the average family size was 3.21.

The median age was 40.3 years. 20.5% of residents were under the age of 18; 13.6% were between the ages of 18 and 24; 21.5% were from 25 to 44; 33.6% were from 45 to 64; and 10.5% were 65 or older. The gender makeup of the city was 56.3% male and 43.7% female.

2000 census
At the 2000 census there were 242 people, 79 households, and 57 families living in the city. The population density was 157.3 people per square mile (60.7/km). There were 94 housing units at an average density of 61.1 per square mile (23.6/km).  The racial makup of the city was 91.32% White, 0.41% Native American, 2.07% Asian, 1.65% from other races, and 4.55% from two or more races. Hispanic or Latino of any race were 1.65%.

Of the 79 households, 44.3% had children under the age of 18 living with them, 54.4% were married couples living together, 11.4% had a female householder with no husband present, and 27.8% were non-families. 22.8% of households were one person, and 11.4% were one person aged 65 or older. The average household size was 3.06 and the average family size was 3.54.

In the city the population was spread out, with 36.8% under the age of 18, 7.9% from 18 to 24, 34.7% from 25 to 44, 14.0% from 45 to 64, and 6.6% 65 or older. The median age was 28 years. For every 100 females, there were 128.3 males. For every 100 females age 18 and over, there were 112.5 males.

The median household income was $33,333 and the median family income was $33,250. Males had a median income of $30,263 versus $14,688 for females. The per capita income for the city was $12,617. About 20.0% of families and 18.7% of the population were below the poverty line, including 26.2% of those under the age of eighteen and none of those 65 or over.

References

Cities in Clay County, Missouri
Cities in Missouri